Werner Schumacher (born 4 May 1921 in Berlin - died 18 April 2004 in Vienna) was a German actor. From 1971 until 1986 he starred in the Süddeutscher Rundfunk version of the popular television crime series Tatort.

Selected filmography
 The Devil's General (1955) - 2. SS-Wachmann
 The Captain from Köpenick (1956) - 2.Gefreiter
 Three Birch Trees on the Heath (1956)
 The Zurich Engagement (1957) - (uncredited)
 Von allen geliebt (1957)
 The Heart of St. Pauli (1957) - Seemann (uncredited)
 Doctor Crippen Lives (1958)
 Grabenplatz 17 (1958)
 Der Schinderhannes (1958) - Leutnant der Gefängniswache
 The Rest Is Silence (1959) - Werks-Fahrer
 The Liar (1961) - Goliath

External links
 

1921 births
2004 deaths
German male television actors
Male actors from Berlin
German male film actors
20th-century German male actors